Giacomo Tebaldi (died 1465) (called the Cardinal of Montefeltro or the Cardinal of Sant'Anastasia) was an Italian Roman Catholic bishop and cardinal.

Biography

Giacomo Tebaldi was born in Rome, the son of nobles Marco and Ventura Tebaldi.  His brother Simone Tebaldi was the personal physician of Pope Callixtus III.

After obtaining a doctorate in civil law, he took Holy Orders as a subdeacon and was later appointed to the episcopate from this rank.

On June 5, 1450, he was elected Bishop of Montefeltro (1450–1458).  He served as governor of Spoleto from September 1455 to November 1456, and then as governor of Perugia.  He was appointed  Archbishop of Naples in August 1456, but he was never installed, and resigned as archbishop in November 1456.

In the consistory of December 17, 1456, Pope Callixtus III made Tebaldi a cardinal priest.   After entering Rome on January 11, 1457, he received the red hat at Santa Maria del Popolo on January 12, 1457.  On January 14, 1457, he was awarded the titular church of Sant'Anastasia. In 1458, he served as Camerlengo of the Sacred College of Cardinals.

He participated in the papal conclave of 1458 that elected Pope Pius II.  He later participated in the papal conclave of 1464 that elected Pope Paul II.

He died in Rome on September 4, 1466.  He is buried in Santa Maria sopra Minerva, with a tomb by Andrea Bregno and Giovanni Dalmata.

References

Books

 (in Latin)
Sciolla, Gianni Carlo (1970). "Profilo di Andrea Bregno". Arte Lombarda,  15, No. 1 (1970), pp. 52–58. Retrieved: 2016-10-25. 

1465 deaths
15th-century Italian cardinals
Year of birth unknown
Clergy from Rome
15th-century Italian Roman Catholic bishops